Thamnobryum is a genus of moss in the family Neckeraceae. There are about 50 species. The genus is distributed throughout the world.

Species

The genus Thamnobryum contains the following species:

Thamnobryum alleghaniense 
Thamnobryum alopecurum 
Thamnobryum aneitense 
Thamnobryum angustifolium  
Thamnobryum arbusculosum 
Thamnobryum assimile 
Thamnobryum canariense 
Thamnobryum capense 
Thamnobryum caroli 
Thamnobryum cataractarum 
Thamnobryum ceylonense 
Thamnobryum confertum 
Thamnobryum coreanum 
Thamnobryum corticola 
Thamnobryum crassinervium 
Thamnobryum ellipticum 
Thamnobryum fasciculatum 
Thamnobryum fernandesii  
Thamnobryum fruticosum 
Thamnobryum grandirete 
Thamnobryum hispidum 
Thamnobryum incurvum 
Thamnobryum ingae 
Thamnobryum latifolium 
Thamnobryum latinerve 
Thamnobryum liesneri 
Thamnobryum macrocarpum 
Thamnobryum maderense 
Thamnobryum malgachum 
Thamnobryum marginatum 
Thamnobryum microalopecurum 
Thamnobryum neckeroides 
Thamnobryum negrosense 
Thamnobryum obtusatum 
Thamnobryum pandum 
Thamnobryum parvulum 
Thamnobryum pendulirameum 
Thamnobryum planifrons 
Thamnobryum plicatulum 
Thamnobryum proboscideum 
Thamnobryum pumilum 
Thamnobryum quisumbingii 
Thamnobryum rigidum 
Thamnobryum rudolphianum 
Thamnobryum schmidii 
Thamnobryum siamense 
Thamnobryum speciosum 
Thamnobryum sublatifolium 
Thamnobryum subseriatum 
Thamnobryum subserratum 
Thamnobryum tumidicaule 
Thamnobryum tumidum 
Thamnobryum umbrosum 
Thamnobryum vorobjovii

References

Neckeraceae
Taxonomy articles created by Polbot
Moss genera